Victoria Park (1957–1985) was a Canadian Thoroughbred racehorse. He was the first Canadian-bred horse to place in an American Triple Crown race.

Background
Victoria Park was a bay horse bred and raced by E. P. Taylor.

Racing career
At age two, the colt won the Clarendon Stakes plus the two richest 2-year-old races in Canada, the Coronation Futurity Stakes and Cup and Saucer Stakes, and was voted Canadian Champion 2-Yr-Old Colt.

Victoria Park finished 3rd behind Venetian Way in the 1960 Kentucky Derby. In the Preakness Stakes, he ran 2nd to Bally Ache whom he had beaten in the Leonard Richards Stakes while setting a new Delaware Park track record. Through February 2020, Victoria Park still holds the Delaware Park track record he set on June 18, 1960 of 1:47 4/5 for one and one-eighth miles on dirt.

Owner E. P. Taylor chose to bypass the Belmont Stakes to return for Canada's most important race, the Queen's Plate. Victoria Park won the race in a record time that stood for more than forty years. He was voted 1960's Canadian Champion 3 Yr-Old Colt and Canadian Horse of the Year.

Stud record
Retired to stud, Victoria Park sired 25 stakes winners, including three Queen's Plate winners: Almoner (1970), Kennedy Road (1971), and Victoria Song (1972). He is the damsire of The Minstrel as well as the damsire of Northern Taste, who led the Japanese leading sires list for ten years, and topped the broodmare sires list a number of times.

On its formation in 1976, Victoria Park was inducted into the Canadian Horse Racing Hall of Fame.

Pedigree

References

1957 racehorse births
1985 racehorse deaths
Racehorses bred in Canada
Racehorses trained in Canada
Horse racing track record setters
King's Plate winners
Canadian Champion racehorses
Canadian Thoroughbred Horse of the Year
Canadian Horse Racing Hall of Fame inductees
British Champion Thoroughbred broodmare sires
Thoroughbred family 10-c